Acquaviva d'Isernia is a comune (municipality) in the Province of Isernia in the southern Italian region of Molise, located about  west of Campobasso and about  northwest of Isernia. The town is located in the valley of the Volturno river.

References

Cities and towns in Molise